Kayam is a 1982 Indian Malayalam film, directed by P. K. Joseph. The film stars Jagathy Sreekumar, Cochin Haneefa, Shankar and Vijayan in the lead roles. The film has musical score by M. K. Arjunan.

Cast
Jagathy Sreekumar
Cochin Haneefa
Shankar
Vijayan
Anjali Naidu
Rathidevi

Soundtrack
The music was composed by M. K. Arjunan and the lyrics were written by Poovachal Khader.

References

External links
 

1982 films
1980s Malayalam-language films